Debra Gore (born 16 July 1967) is a British swimmer.

Swimming career
Gore competed in the women's 4 × 100 metre freestyle relay at the 1984 Summer Olympics. She represented England and won a gold medal in the 4 x 100 metres freestyle relay, at the 1982 Commonwealth Games in Brisbane, Queensland, Australia. Four years later she represented England in the 100 metres freestyle, at the 1986 Commonwealth Games in Edinburgh, Scotland. She also won the 1984 ASA National Championship 100 metres freestyle title.

References

External links
 

1967 births
Living people
British female swimmers
Olympic swimmers of Great Britain
Swimmers at the 1984 Summer Olympics
Sportspeople from Blackpool
Commonwealth Games medallists in swimming
Commonwealth Games gold medallists for England
Swimmers at the 1982 Commonwealth Games
20th-century British women
Medallists at the 1982 Commonwealth Games